Fanny Sundström (1883, Sund, Åland – 1944) was a teacher, politician and women's right activist in Åland, Finland. After becoming a primary school teacher, she took an active part in the "Martha Movement" (sv. Marthaföreningen) and worked for social improvements.

The Martha Movement was established in 1899 by a group of women who established the Martha Organization to advance Finland's economic and cultural life. This organisation improved the health and well-being of children and families, and helped to build the early foundations for the welfare society.

But the change wasn't only social and economic. Before and after the constitutional reforms in Finland in 1906, the Martha Movement played a vital role in training women to use their political rights. The result was that in Finland's first modern parliamentary elections in 1907, 19 women were elected to the 200-member parliament. Many of these women supported efforts to improve women's social conditions.

In 1922 Fanny Sundström was the only woman to be elected to the first Parliament of Åland. In 1929 she was elected to the municipal council. She remained politically active until her death.

1883 births
1944 deaths
People from Sund, Åland
People from Turku and Pori Province (Grand Duchy of Finland)
Swedish-speaking Finns
Women from Åland in politics
Finnish educators
20th-century Finnish women politicians